Huldricus (also Huldaricus, Huldrych, Huldreich) is a variant of the given name Ulrich first introduced by Zwingli in the early 16th century and occasionally used as a variant of the name since.
 Huldrych Zwingli (1484–1531), leader of the Swiss Reformation
Huldaricus Mutius, latinized name of Ulrich Hugwald (1496-1571)
 Fridericus Huldaricus, latinized name of Frederick Ulrich, Duke of Brunswick-Lüneburg (1591–1634)
 Huldaricus Schönberger (Johann Ulrich Schönberger, 1601–1649), German blind organist, organ builder and polymath 
 Huldreich Georg Früh (1903–1945), Swiss composer

See also
 Ulrich#History